The event was held for the first time since 1989, when Rick Leach and Jim Pugh won the title.  Neither player participated this year.

Mark Keil and Dave Randall won the title, defeating Kent Kinnear and Sven Salumaa 4–6, 6–1, 6–2 in the final.

Seeds

  Ken Flach /  Robert Seguso (first round)
  Sergio Casal /  Emilio Sánchez (quarterfinals)
  Javier Frana /  Leonardo Lavalle (semifinals)
  Stefan Kruger /  Piet Norval (quarterfinals)

Draw

Draw

External links
 Doubles draw

Tennis Channel Open
1992 ATP Tour
1992 Tennis Channel Open